Eduardo Reis (born 17 November 1986), commonly known as Grillo, is a Brazilian futsal player who plays as a defender for Copagril and the Brazilian national futsal team.

References

External links
Liga Nacional de Futsal profile

1986 births
Living people
Brazilian men's futsal players